The Holboca Power Station is a large thermal power plant located in Holboca, having 2 generation groups of 50 MW each having a total electricity generation capacity of 100 MW.

References

Natural gas-fired power stations in Romania
Buildings and structures in Iași County